

See also 
 Lists of fossiliferous stratigraphic units in Europe

References 
 

 Luxembourg
Geology of Luxembourg
Paleontology in Luxembourg
Fossiliferous stratigraphic units